Tapa Parish is a rural municipality in Lääne-Viru County in northern Estonia.

The administrative centre of the municipality is the town of Tapa. It is located 70 km east of Estonia's capital, Tallinn.

History 
Tapa Parish was established by merging in October 2005 the town of Tapa with Lehtse and Saksi rural municipalities and in October 2017 the Tapa and Tamsalu rural municipalities.

Religion

Local government 
Chairman of the Council:
 2017-2018 - Toomas Uudeberg
 from 2018 - Maksim Butšenkov

Mayor:
 2017-2018 - Alari Kirt
 from 2018 - Riho Tell

Geography

Populated places 
There are two towns Tapa and Tamsalu, two small boroughs Lehtse and Sääse and 55 villages: Aavere, Alupere, Araski, Assamalla, Imastu, Jootme, Jäneda, Järsi, Järvajõe, Kadapiku, Kaeva, Karkuse, Kerguta, Koiduküla, Koplitaguse, Kuie, Kullenga, Kursi, Kuru, Kõrveküla, Lemmküla, Linnape, Loksa, Loksu, Lokuta, Läpi, Läste, Metskaevu, Moe, Naistevälja, Nõmmküla, Näo, Patika, Piilu, Piisupi, Porkuni, Pruuna, Põdrangu, Rabasaare, Raudla, Rägavere, Räsna, Saiakopli, Saksi, Sauvälja, Savalduma, Tõõrakõrve, Türje, Uudeküla, Vadiküla, Vahakulmu, Vajangu, Vistla, Võhmetu, Võhmuta.

References

External links